Garhi Yasin Sindh is a town and taluka of Shikarpur District, Sindh, Pakistan.

One of the three talukas (sub-districts) of Shikarpur, Garhi Yasin is of political and historical significance to Pakistan. On 1 June 1977 the old Shikarpur subdivision, consisting of the two talukas of Shikarpur and Garhiyasin, was separated from Sukkur District, and a new District Shikarpur was created and attached to Larkana Division.

Garhi Yasin is a town located in the north of Sindh province of Pakistan. It is the second largest town of the district Shikarpur, having population of more than 14,000. Garhi Yasin is situated on the right bank of River Indus. Garhi Yasin region has always been important because of proximity of Shikarpur, a place that commanded the trade route through the Bolan Pass, and its merchants had dealings with many towns in Central Asia.

Garhi Yasin taluka comprises two main towns Dakhan, Madeji and some main villages Tarai,pirchandam,Haji Rohelo Khan Jaffri, and Bado. Garhi

Education
The town has a Higher Secondary School Agha Badaruddin Khan Durrani and three high schools, several primary schools.

Agriculture
A considerable part of the area is irrigated. Major productions of the area are rice, wheat and pulses beside Maize, sugarcane, vegetables fruits etc.

Industry
It has a small market and manufactures of handicrafts, metal ware, furniture, bricks and pottery. Hand-loom weaving of the area used to be very popular.

Land
It is chiefly alluvial plain. The lands are greatly suffered after construction of barrage at Sukkur and being rapidly converted into salt lands (Kalar). Waterlogging and salinity is a major problem of Garhi Yasin. The climate is very hot as it reached 49 °C last year 2016, dry and enervating.

Populated places in Shikarpur District